Marcos Cruz  is a Puerto Rican politician and the current mayor of Vega Baja. Cruz is affiliated with the Popular Democratic Party (PPD) and has served as mayor since 2013.

References

Living people
Mayors of places in Puerto Rico
Popular Democratic Party (Puerto Rico) politicians
People from Vega Baja, Puerto Rico
Year of birth missing (living people)